Zaozerye is the name of several  rural localities in Russia.

Arkhangelsk Oblast
As of 2010, ten rural localities in Arkhangelsk Oblast bear this name:
Zaozerye, Khavrogorsky Selsoviet, Kholmogorsky District, Arkhangelsk Oblast, a village in Khavrogorsky Selsoviet of Kholmogorsky District
Zaozerye, Matigorsky Selsoviet, Kholmogorsky District, Arkhangelsk Oblast, a village in Matigorsky Selsoviet of Kholmogorsky District
Zaozerye, Konoshsky District, Arkhangelsk Oblast, a village in Klimovsky Selsoviet of Konoshsky District
Zaozerye, Leshukonsky District, Arkhangelsk Oblast, a village in Nisogorsky Selsoviet of Leshukonsky District
Zaozerye, Mezensky District, Arkhangelsk Oblast, a village in Lampozhensky Selsoviet of Mezensky District
Zaozerye, Trufanogorsky Selsoviet, Pinezhsky District, Arkhangelsk Oblast, a village in Trufanogorsky Selsoviet of Pinezhsky District
Zaozerye, Yurolsky Selsoviet, Pinezhsky District, Arkhangelsk Oblast, a village in Yurolsky Selsoviet of Pinezhsky District
Zaozerye, Primorsky District, Arkhangelsk Oblast, a village in Lisestrovsky Selsoviet of Primorsky District
Zaozerye, Verkhnetoyemsky District, Arkhangelsk Oblast, a village in Vyysky Selsoviet of Verkhnetoyemsky District
Zaozerye, Vilegodsky District, Arkhangelsk Oblast, a village in Pavlovsky Selsoviet of Vilegodsky District

Ivanovo Oblast
As of 2010, one rural locality in Ivanovo Oblast bears this name:
Zaozerye, Ivanovo Oblast, a village in Savinsky District

Kaliningrad Oblast
As of 2010, one rural locality in Kaliningrad Oblast bears this name:
Zaozerye, Kaliningrad Oblast, a settlement in Nizovsky Rural Okrug of Guryevsky District

Republic of Karelia
As of 2010, two rural localities in the Republic of Karelia bear this name:
Zaozerye, Prionezhsky District, Republic of Karelia, a selo in Prionezhsky District
Zaozerye, Pudozhsky District, Republic of Karelia, a village in Pudozhsky District

Kirov Oblast
As of 2010, one rural locality in Kirov Oblast bears this name:
Zaozerye, Kirov Oblast, a village in Smetaninsky Rural Okrug of Sanchursky District

Komi Republic
As of 2010, two rural localities in the Komi Republic bear this name:
Zaozerye (settlement), Komi Republic, a settlement in Zaozerye Rural-Type Settlement Administrative Territory of Sysolsky District
Zaozerye (village), Komi Republic, a village in Zaozerye Rural-Type Settlement Administrative Territory of Sysolsky District

Kostroma Oblast
As of 2010, one rural locality in Kostroma Oblast bears this name:
Zaozerye, Kostroma Oblast, a khutor in Sandogorskoye Settlement of Kostromskoy District

Leningrad Oblast
As of 2010, seven rural localities in Leningrad Oblast bear this name:
Zaozerye, Gatchinsky District, Leningrad Oblast, a village in Druzhnogorskoye Settlement Municipal Formation of Gatchinsky District
Zaozerye, Kingiseppsky District, Leningrad Oblast, a village in Nezhnovskoye Settlement Municipal Formation of Kingiseppsky District
Zaozerye, Lodeynopolsky District, Leningrad Oblast, a village in Alekhovshchinskoye Settlement Municipal Formation of Lodeynopolsky District
Zaozerye, Dzerzhinskoye Settlement Municipal Formation, Luzhsky District, Leningrad Oblast, a village in Dzerzhinskoye Settlement Municipal Formation of Luzhsky District
Zaozerye, Volodarskoye Settlement Municipal Formation, Luzhsky District, Leningrad Oblast, a village in Volodarskoye Settlement Municipal Formation of Luzhsky District
Zaozerye, Tolmachevskoye Settlement Municipal Formation, Luzhsky District, Leningrad Oblast, a village under the administrative jurisdiction of  Tolmachevskoye Settlement Municipal Formation of Luzhsky District
Zaozerye, Podporozhsky District, Leningrad Oblast, a village in Vazhinskoye Settlement Municipal Formation of Podporozhsky District

Moscow Oblast
As of 2010, two rural localities in Moscow Oblast bear this name:
Zaozerye, Pavlovo-Posadsky District, Moscow Oblast, a village in Kuznetsovskoye Rural Settlement of Pavlovo-Posadsky District
Zaozerye, Ramensky District, Moscow Oblast, a village in Ostrovetskoye Rural Settlement of Ramensky District

Nizhny Novgorod Oblast
As of 2010, two rural localities in Nizhny Novgorod Oblast bear this name:
Zaozerye, Bogorodsky District, Nizhny Novgorod Oblast, a village in Dudenevsky Selsoviet of Bogorodsky District
Zaozerye, Voskresensky District, Nizhny Novgorod Oblast, a village in Nestiarsky Selsoviet of Voskresensky District

Novgorod Oblast
As of 2010, seven rural localities in Novgorod Oblast bear this name:
Zaozerye, Demyansky District, Novgorod Oblast, a village in Pesotskoye Settlement of Demyansky District
Zaozerye, Khvoyninsky District, Novgorod Oblast, a village in Ostakhnovskoye Settlement of Khvoyninsky District
Zaozerye, Lyubytinsky District, Novgorod Oblast, a village under the administrative jurisdiction of the urban-type settlement of Lyubytino in Lyubytinsky District
Zaozerye (railway station), Berezovikskoye Settlement, Okulovsky District, Novgorod Oblast, a railway station in Berezovikskoye Settlement of Okulovsky District
Zaozerye (village), Berezovikskoye Settlement, Okulovsky District, Novgorod Oblast, a village in Berezovikskoye Settlement of Okulovsky District
Zaozerye, Uglovka, Okulovsky District, Novgorod Oblast, a village under the administrative jurisdiction of the urban-type settlement of Uglovka in Okulovsky District
Zaozerye, Poddorsky District, Novgorod Oblast, a village in Belebelkovskoye Settlement of Poddorsky District

Perm Krai
As of 2010, four rural localities in Perm Krai bear this name:
Zaozerye (Nikiforovskoye Rural Settlement), Chusovoy, Perm Krai, a village under the administrative jurisdiction of the town of krai significance of Chusovoy; municipally, a part of Nikiforovskoye Rural Settlement of Chusovskoy Municipal District
Zaozerye (Verkhnekalinskoye Rural Settlement), Chusovoy, Perm Krai, a village under the administrative jurisdiction of the town of krai significance of Chusovoy; municipally, a part of Verkhnekalinskoye Rural Settlement of Chusovskoy Municipal District
Zaozerye (Khokhlovskoye Rural Settlement), Permsky District, Perm Krai, a village in Permsky District; municipally, a part of Khokhlovskoye Rural Settlement of that district
Zaozerye (Ust-Kachkinskoye Rural Settlement), Permsky District, Perm Krai, a village in Permsky District; municipally, a part of Ust-Kachkinskoye Rural Settlement of that district

Pskov Oblast
As of 2010, eleven rural localities in Pskov Oblast bear this name:
Zaozerye, Dedovichsky District, Pskov Oblast, a village in Dedovichsky District
Zaozerye, Dedovichsky District, Pskov Oblast, a village in Dedovichsky District
Zaozerye, Gdovsky District, Pskov Oblast, a village in Gdovsky District
Zaozerye (Lyadskaya Rural Settlement), Plyussky District, Pskov Oblast, a village in Plyussky District; municipally, a part of Lyadskaya Rural Settlement of that district
Zaozerye (Lyadskaya Rural Settlement), Plyussky District, Pskov Oblast, a village in Plyussky District; municipally, a part of Lyadskaya Rural Settlement of that district
Zaozerye (Plyusskaya Rural Settlement), Plyussky District, Pskov Oblast, a village in Plyussky District; municipally, a part of Plyusskaya Rural Settlement of that district
Zaozerye, Porkhovsky District, Pskov Oblast, a village in Porkhovsky District
Zaozerye, Pustoshkinsky District, Pskov Oblast, a village in Pustoshkinsky District
Zaozerye, Pytalovsky District, Pskov Oblast, a village in Pytalovsky District
Zaozerye (Novoselskaya Rural Settlement), Strugo-Krasnensky District, Pskov Oblast, a village in Strugo-Krasnensky District; municipally, a part of Novoselskaya Rural Settlement of that district
Zaozerye (Maryinskaya Rural Settlement), Strugo-Krasnensky District, Pskov Oblast, a village in Strugo-Krasnensky District; municipally, a part of Maryinskaya Rural Settlement of that district

Rostov Oblast
As of 2010, one rural locality in Rostov Oblast bears this name:
Zaozerye, Rostov Oblast, a settlement in Kommunarskoye Rural Settlement of Oktyabrsky District

Smolensk Oblast
As of 2010, four rural localities in Smolensk Oblast bear this name:
Zaozerye, Demidovsky District, Smolensk Oblast, a village in Baklanovskoye Rural Settlement of Demidovsky District
Zaozerye, Rudnyansky District, Smolensk Oblast, a village in Perevolochskoye Rural Settlement of Rudnyansky District
Zaozerye, Smolensky District, Smolensk Oblast, a village in Novoselskoye Rural Settlement of Smolensky District
Zaozerye, Velizhsky District, Smolensk Oblast, a village in Zaozerskoye Rural Settlement of Velizhsky District

Tver Oblast
As of 2010, eight rural localities in Tver Oblast bear this name:
Zaozerye, Andreapolsky District, Tver Oblast, a village in Andreapolsky District
Zaozerye, Andreapolsky District, Tver Oblast, a village in Andreapolsky District
Zaozerye, Bologovsky District, Tver Oblast, a village in Bologovsky District
Zaozerye, Kalininsky District, Tver Oblast, a village in Kalininsky District
Zaozerye, Konakovsky District, Tver Oblast, a village in Konakovsky District
Zaozerye (Shchuchyenskoye Rural Settlement), Ostashkovsky District, Tver Oblast, a village in Ostashkovsky District; municipally, a part of Shchuchyenskoye Rural Settlement of that district
Zaozerye (Zaluchyenskoye Rural Settlement), Ostashkovsky District, Tver Oblast, a village in Ostashkovsky District; municipally, a part of Zaluchyenskoye Rural Settlement of that district
Zaozerye, Selizharovsky District, Tver Oblast, a village in Selizharovsky District

Vladimir Oblast
As of 2010, one rural locality in Vladimir Oblast bears this name:
Zaozerye, Vladimir Oblast, a village in Gorokhovetsky District

Vologda Oblast
As of 2010, four rural localities in Vologda Oblast bear this name:
Zaozerye, Kaduysky District, Vologda Oblast, a village in Chuprinsky Selsoviet of Kaduysky District
Zaozerye, Sheksninsky District, Vologda Oblast, a village in Yershovsky Selsoviet of Sheksninsky District
Zaozerye, Velikoustyugsky District, Vologda Oblast, a village in Tregubovsky Selsoviet of Velikoustyugsky District
Zaozerye, Vozhegodsky District, Vologda Oblast, a village in Nizhneslobodsky Selsoviet of Vozhegodsky District

Yaroslavl Oblast
As of 2010, two rural localities in Yaroslavl Oblast bear this name:
Zaozerye, Rostovsky District, Yaroslavl Oblast, a village in Itlarsky Rural Okrug of Rostovsky District
Zaozerye, Uglichsky District, Yaroslavl Oblast, a selo in Zaozersky Rural Okrug of Uglichsky District